Aziz Corr Nyang (born 27 August 1984 in Banjul) is a Gambian footballer who plays as a striker.

Honours

Club 

 Djurgårdens IF 
 Allsvenskan (2): 2002, 2003
 Svenska Cupen (2): 2002, 2004

References

External links
 
 
 

1981 births
Living people
Association football midfielders
Gambian footballers
Gambian expatriate footballers
The Gambia international footballers
IFK Lidingö players
Åtvidabergs FF players
Djurgårdens IF Fotboll players
GIF Sundsvall players
Valletta F.C. players
IF Brommapojkarna players
Assyriska FF players
Allsvenskan players
Superettan players
Expatriate footballers in Sweden
Gambian expatriate sportspeople in Sweden
Maltese Premier League players
Expatriate footballers in Malta
Ports Authority F.C. players
Tyresö FF (men) players